SanDisk is a brand for flash memory products, including memory cards and readers, USB flash drives, solid-state drives, and digital audio players, manufactured and marketed by Western Digital. The original company, SanDisk Corporation was acquired by Western Digital in 2016.

 Western Digital was the fourth-largest manufacturer of flash memory having declined from third-largest in 2014.

History

SanDisk was founded in 1988 by Eli Harari, Sanjay Mehrotra, and Jack Yuan, incorporated at the time as SunDisk. SanDisk co-founder Eli Harari developed the Floating Gate EEPROM which proved the practicality, reliability and endurance of semiconductor-based data storage. 

In 1991 SanDisk produced the first flash-based solid-state drive (SSD) in a 2.5-inch hard disk drive form factor for IBM with a 20 MB capacity priced at about $1,000.

In 1992, SanDisk (then SunDisk) introduced FlashDisk, a series of memory cards made for the PCMCIA or PC card form factor, so they could be inserted into the expansion slots of many laptops and handheld PCs of the time. Unlike other similar products at the time, FlashDisks did not require a battery to store their contents. SanDisk discontinued their production in 2002, and the highest capacity model had 8 gigabytes of capacity. 

In 1995, just before its initial public offering, SunDisk changed its name to SanDisk, possibly to avoid confusion with Sun Microsystems, a prominent computer manufacturer at the time.  

On May 10, 2000, the Toshiba Corporation of Japan and the SanDisk Corporation said that they would jointly form a new semiconductor company to produce advanced flash memory, primarily for digital cameras.

In 2005 SanDisk entered the digital audio player market with the release of its first flash-based MP3 player, the SanDisk Sansa e100. As soon as 2006, they became the second largest maker of digital audio players in the United States behind Apple.

Acquisitions and growth
 In October 2005, SanDisk acquired Matrix Semiconductor.
 In July 2006, SanDisk acquired M-Systems.
 In May 2011, SanDisk acquired Pliant Technology, a manufacturer of solid state drives, for US$327 million.
 In February 2012, SanDisk acquired FlashSoft.
 In June 2012, SanDisk acquired Schooner Information Technology, developer of the flash-optimized database software SchoonerSQL and caching software Membrain.
 In July 2013, SanDisk acquired SMART Storage Systems, a producer of SSDs for the enterprise market, for US$307 million.
 In June 2014, SanDisk acquired Fusion-io, a producer of flash memory for enterprise data centers, for $1.1 billion.

Awards and sale
In 2012, the Enough Project ranked SanDisk the third highest of 24 consumer electronics companies on "progress on conflict minerals".

In 2014, SanDisk co-founder Harari won the National Medal of Technology and Innovation from President Barack Obama for his innovations and contributions to flash memory storage.

On January 8, 2015, NexGen Storage, which had been acquired by Fusion-io, was spun out to become an independent company once again.
In January 2016, Pivot3 (based in Austin, Texas) acquired NexGen Storage. 
SanDisk was acquired by hard disk drive manufacturer Western Digital on May 12, 2016, for US$19 billion.

In 2019 Sanjay Mehrotra received a lifetime achievement award at a trade show.

See also
 Eye-Fi
 FlashCP
 SanDisk portable media players
 SanDisk Professional
 USB flash drive security
 StartKey
 U3
 ULLtraDIMM

References

External links

 

 
1988 establishments in California
1995 initial public offerings
2016 mergers and acquisitions
American brands
American companies established in 1988
Companies based in Milpitas, California
Companies formerly listed on the Nasdaq
Computer companies established in 1988
Computer memory companies
Computer storage companies
Manufacturing companies based in the San Francisco Bay Area
Portable audio player manufacturers
Technology companies based in the San Francisco Bay Area
Western Digital